The 2004 Fresno mayoral election was held on March 2, 2004 to elect the mayor of Fresno, California. It saw the reelection of Alan Autry.

Since Autry won a majority in the first round, no runoff was required.

Results

References 

2004 California elections
Mayoral elections in Fresno, California
Fresno